Dungan revolt may refer to:

 Dungan revolt (1862–77), rebellion of various Muslim ethnic groups in Shaanxi and Gansu, China
 Dungan revolt (1895–96), rebellion of various Muslim ethnic groups in Qinghai and Gansu, China